is a Japanese actor and musician from Mobara, Chiba Prefecture. He is a former Johnny's Jr. member and is no longer represented by Johnny & Associates. While a Johnny's Jr., he was part of Kaidan Trio, TOKYO, and Kawano Band. He was also formerly the drummer of the rock band Dustz, fronted by fellow actor Ray Fujita. His debut role as an actor was as the antagonist Long in the Super Sentai series Juken Sentai Gekiranger.

Filmography

 The little girl in me (2012)
 125 Years Memory (2015)
 Flower and Snake: Zero (2014)

References

External links
Official profile 
Personal blog 

1982 births
People from Mobara
Actors from Chiba Prefecture
Japanese drummers
Living people
Musicians from Chiba Prefecture
21st-century drummers
Japanese male actors